Boufflers is a commune in France.

Boufflers may also refer to:

 Louis François, duc de Boufflers (1644-1711), French soldier and aristocrat
 Louis Franois, Marquis de Boufflers (1714-1752), French soldier and aristocrat
 Stanislas Jean, chevalier de Boufflers (1738-1815), a French writer